Eric Eugene Everett (born July 13, 1966) is a former professional American football cornerback in the National Football League. He played for five seasons with the Philadelphia Eagles, the Tampa Bay Buccaneers, the Kansas City Chiefs, and the Minnesota Vikings.  He was a 5th round selection (122nd overall pick) in the 1988 NFL Draft out of Texas Tech University.

Everett is now a physical education coach at DeWitt Perry Middle School in Carrollton, Texas.

Everett's brother, Thomas Everett, is a former American football safety in the National Football League.

References 

1966 births
Living people
People from Daingerfield, Texas
American football cornerbacks
Texas Tech Red Raiders football players
Philadelphia Eagles players
Tampa Bay Buccaneers players
Kansas City Chiefs players
Minnesota Vikings players